A total lunar eclipse took place on Wednesday, May 3, 1939. A shallow total eclipse saw the Moon in relative darkness for 1 hour and 2 minutes. The Moon was 18% of its diameter into the Earth's umbral shadow, and should have been significantly darkened. The partial eclipse lasted for 3 hours and 27 minutes in total.

Visibility

Related lunar eclipses

Saros series

Inex series

Half-Saros cycle
A lunar eclipse will be preceded and followed by solar eclipses by 9 years and 5.5 days (a half saros). This lunar eclipse is related to two solar eclipses of Solar Saros 137.

See also
List of lunar eclipses
List of 20th-century lunar eclipses

Notes

External links

1939-05
1939 in science